Babu Ishwar Sharan Singh was an Indian freedom fighter, social worker and politician. He was born in Gonda, Uttar Pradesh. He was elected as an Member of the Uttar Pradesh Legislative Assembly from Gonda Assembly constituency. He died on 26 august 1991.

Early life and education 
Ishwar Sharan Singh was born on 5 August 1902 in Gonda, Uttar Pradesh.

He completed his primary education from Ramdas Arya Pathshala, Etah. In 1915 and 1916 he admitted in Rajkiya High Schoo, Gonda.

Legacy 
On his memory a district governmental hospital, Babu Ishwar Sharan Singh Chikitshalaya in Gonda.

See also 

 Fasi-ur-Rehman Munnan Khan
 Gonda district

References 

1902 births
1991 deaths
People from Gonda, Uttar Pradesh
Uttar Pradesh MLAs 1962–1967
Indian independence activists from Uttar Pradesh